The Tobacco State League was a Class D level American minor baseball league that played for five seasons (1946–1950) in Organized Baseball in the state of North Carolina. The Red Springs Red Robins won two league championships.

History
The Tobacco State League was one of many low-level minor leagues that flourished immediately after World War II before disbanding in the 1950s. Founded as a six-team circuit in 1946, the league sported eight teams for the final four years of its existence, although one of its teams, the charter member Smithfield-Selma Leafs, was forced to drop out during the closing weeks of the TSL's final 1950 season. With the exceptions of Lumberton (Chicago Cubs) and Red Springs (Philadelphia Athletics), its members were unaffiliated with Major League Baseball farm systems.

Member teams

Angier, NC & Fuquay Springs, NC: Angier-Fuquay Springs Bulls 1946 (Champions, 1946)
Clinton, NC: Clinton Blues1946–1948; Clinton Sampson Blues 1949–1950
Dunn, NC & Erwin, NC: Dunn-Erwin Twins 1946–1950
Fayetteville, NC: Fayetteville Scotties 1949
Lumberton, NC: Lumberton Cubs 1947–1948; Lumberton Auctioneers 1949–1950
Red Springs, NC: Red Springs Red Robins 1947–1950 (Champions, 1948, 1949)

Rockingham, NC: Rockingham Eagles 1950 (Champions, 1950)
Sanford, NC: Sanford Spinners 1946–1950 (Champions, 1947)
Smithfield, NC & Selma, NC: Smithfield-Selma Leafs 1946–1950
Warsaw, NC: Warsaw Red Sox 1947–1948
Whiteville, NC: Whiteville Tobs 1950
Wilmington, NC: Wilmington Pirates 1946–1950

Standings & statistics 
 
Playoffs: Angier-Fuquay 4 games, Sanford 2; Clinton 4 games, Springfield 1. Finals: Angier-Fuquay 4 games, Clinton 3.
 

Playoffs: Sanford 4 games, Wilmington 3; Lumberton 4 games, Dunn-Erwin 1. Finals: Sanford 4 games, Lumberton 3.
 

 Playoffs: Sanford 4 games, Smithfield-Selma 1; Red Springs 4 games, Wilmington 3. Finals: Red Springs 4 games, Sanford 1. 
 

 Playoffs: Dunn-Erwin 4 games, Lumberton 1; Red Springs 4 games, Sanford 2. Finals: Red Springs 4 games, Dunn Erwin 1.
 

  Playoffs: Rockingham 4 games, Lumberton 2; Stanford 4 games, Red Springs 0; Finals: Rockingham 4 games, Stanford 3

References

External links
Baseball Reference

Defunct minor baseball leagues in the United States
Baseball leagues in North Carolina
1946 establishments in North Carolina
1950 disestablishments in North Carolina
Sports leagues established in 1946
Sports leagues disestablished in 1950